Abane Ramdane (June 10, 1920 – December 26, 1957) was an Algerian political activist and revolutionary. He played a key role in the organization of the independence struggle during the Algerian war. His influence was so great that he was known as "the architect of the revolution".  He was also the architect of the Soummam conference Bejaia in 1956 and was very close to Frantz Fanon.

In the spring of 1957, rifts developed between Ramdane and other major figureheads in the National Liberation Front (FLN). At the time, there was an internal struggle between the military and civil factions in the FLN, and Ramdane was accused of creating a "cult of personality".

He was "super-political" and his murder was disturbing to many FLN members including President Houari Boumediene who, according to the 1977 book by Alistair Horne, A Savage War of Peace: Algeria 1954-1962, kept the assassins out of his future Algerian government.

A few years after independence, he was reburied in his native village of Azouza in Tizi Ouzou Province.

References

1920 births
1957 deaths
Algerian Berber politicians
Assassinated Algerian people
Kabyle people
Members of the National Liberation Front (Algeria)
Movement for the Triumph of Democratic Liberties politicians
People from Larbaâ Nath Irathen